Until We Meet Again is a 1952 West German romantic drama film directed by Gustav Ucicky and starring Maria Schell, O. W. Fischer, and Karl Ludwig Diehl. It was shot at the Göttingen Studios and on location at Lake Como, Slough in England, Guatemala and Zweibrücken. The film's sets were designed by the art directors Hans Ledersteger and Ernst Richter.

Cast

References

Bibliography

External links 
 

1952 films
West German films
German romantic drama films
1952 romantic drama films
1950s German-language films
Films directed by Gustav Ucicky
Gloria Film films
German black-and-white films
1950s German films
Films shot at Göttingen Studios
Films shot in Berkshire